The 1975–76 Eredivisie was the 15th season of the highest-level basketball league in the Netherlands, and the 30th season of the top flight Dutch basketball competition.

BV Amstelveen (known as Kinzo Amstelveen for sponsorship reasons) won its first league title.

Standings

Individual awards 

 Most Valuable Player: Hank Smith (Delta Lloyd Amsterdam)
 Coach of the Year: Tom Quinn (Flamingo's Haarlem)
 Rookie of the Year: Cock van de Lagemaat (Flamingo's Haarlem)
 First-team All-Eredivisie:
 Owen Wells (BV Amstelveen)
 Joe Wallace (BV Amstelveen)
 Hank Smith (Delta Lloyd Amsterdam)
 Steven Bravard (EBBC Den Bosch)
 Gary Freeman (Flamingo's Haarlem)
 All-Defensive Team:
 Hank Smith (Delta Lloyd Amsterdam)
 Charles Kirkland (Punch Delft)
 Steven Bravard (Den Bosch)
 Jimmy Woudstra (Punch Delft)
 Craig Casault (Rotterdam-Zuid)

References 

Dutch Basketball League seasons
1975–76 in European basketball